The blue cuckooshrike (Cyanograucalus azureus) is a species of bird in the Cuckooshrike family, Campephagidae.
It is found from Sierra Leone and Liberia to eastern and south-western Democratic Republic of Congo.
Its natural habitats are subtropical or tropical dry forests and subtropical or tropical moist lowland forests.

This species was formerly placed in the genus Coracina. A molecular phylogenetic study published in 2010 found the genus Coracina was non-monophyletic. In the resulting reorganization to create monophyletic genera, the blue cuckooshrike is the only species placed in the resurrected genus Cyanograucalus.

References

External links
Image at ADW 

blue cuckooshrike
Birds of Central Africa
Birds of West Africa
blue cuckooshrike
Taxonomy articles created by Polbot